Nicolas Revel né Ricard (born 26 May 1966) is a French senior civil servant. He has been the Prime Minister's Chief of Staff between 3 July 2020 and  May 2022.

He was Assistant General Secretary of the President alongside Emmanuel Macron from 2012 to 2014, then Director of the National Health Insurance Fund from 2014 to 2020.

Family 
Nicolas Revel, born Ricard, is the son of academician Jean-François Revel, born Ricard (1924–2006), and journalist Claude Sarraute (born 1927). His maternal grandmother, Nathalie Sarraute (1900–1999), was a Jewish woman of Russian background who came to France as a child.

He has on his mother's side two half-brothers, Laurent and Martin and a half-sister, Véronique; and on his father's side he has a half-sister and a half-brother, Ève and Matthieu Ricard, who is a Buddhist monk and a writer. His aunts are Anne Sarraute and photographer Dominique Sarraute.

He has three sons named Simon, David et Benjamin.

Career 
A graduate of the Institut d'études politiques de Paris (Public Service section, class of 1988) and former student of the École nationale d'administration (class of Léon-Gambetta, 1991–1993), Nicolas Revel joined the Court of Auditors as legal adviser.

In 2000, he was appointed technical advisor by the Minister of Agriculture Jean Glavany.

After Bertrand Delanoë's victory in the 2001 municipal elections, the new mayor of Paris chose him as deputy chief of staff (in 2003). He appointed him Chief of Staff in 2008.

References 

1966 births
Living people
Sciences Po alumni
École nationale d'administration alumni
Chevaliers of the Légion d'honneur
Judges of the Court of Audit (France)
Civil servants from Paris